Mentzelia pumila, (dwarf mentzelia, desert blazing star, blazing star, bullet stickleaf, golden blazing star, yellow mentzelia, evening star, moonflower, Wyoming stickleaf, etc.) is a biennial wildflower found in the western United States and northwestern Mexico from Montana and North Dakota, south to Sonora and Chihuahua. It is a blazingstar and a member of the genus Mentzelia, the stickleafs; member species are also called "evening stars", but some stickleafs close at sunset, as does M. pumila.

Leaves of Mentzelia pumila are long, very narrow, and serrated-pinnate-like; also medium to light grayish green; an individual plant in an opportune site can be 1.5– in height. The flowers are a bright, glossy medium yellow, and the major petals are variable, sometimes 5 major, 5 minor; also 4 and 4.

Mentzelia pumila is covered in minute elaborations known as trichomes, which pierce and trap insects that land on it. A species of aphid, Macrosyphum mentzeliae colonises the plant and is afforded protection, since its main predator, the ladybird beetle, is unable to avoid the trichomes.

Uses
The root is a laxative. The Zuni people insert this plant into the rectum as a suppository for constipation. The plant is also used to whip children to make them strong so they could hold on to a horse without falling.

Footnotes

References
USDA: NRCS: Plants Profile Mentzelia pumila
Mentzelia pumila synopsis at LBJ Wildflower Center

External links
Photo-Medium Res--(NOTE: 5-1/2 major petals, 5 minor-(a VARIATION)); Article – www.saguaro-juniper.com – "Wildflowers on Saguaro-Juniper Lands"
Photo-High Res--(Field Photo); Photo-(Flower-(and Seed pod)--Very High Res); Article – www.naturesongs.com – "Verde Valley-(Arizona) Plants"

pumila
Night-blooming plants
North American desert flora
Flora of the Western United States
Flora of the Sonoran Deserts
Flora of Northwestern Mexico
Plants used in traditional Native American medicine
Flora without expected TNC conservation status